The 2006 NCAA Men's Water Polo Championship was the 38th annual NCAA Men's Water Polo Championship to determine the national champion of NCAA men's collegiate water polo. Tournament matches were played at the Burns Aquatics Center at Loyola Marymount University in Los Angeles, California from December 2–3, 2006.

California defeated USC in the final, 7–6, to win their twelfth national title. The Golden Bears (31–4) were coached by Kirk Everist.

The Most Outstanding Player of the tournament was Mark Sheredy from California. Additionally, two All-Tournament Teams were named: a First Team (with seven players including Sheredy) and a Second Team (with eight players).

The tournament's leading scorer, with 6 goals, was Juan Delgadillo from USC.

Qualification
Since there has only ever been one single national championship for water polo, all NCAA men's water polo programs (whether from Division I, Division II, or Division III) were eligible. A total of 4 teams were invited to contest this championship.

Bracket
Site: Burns Aquatics Center, Los Angeles, California

All-tournament teams

First Team 
Mark Sheredy, California (Most outstanding player)
Tommy Corcoran, USC
Juan Delgadillo, USC
Thomas Hale, USC
Brian Kinsel, California
John Mann, California
Andrija Vasiljevic, California

Second Team 
Brian Bacharach, California
Jesse Cassellini, UC San Diego
Ty Lacky, UC San Diego
Marty Matthies, California
Aaron Recko, Navy
Adam Shilling, USC
Pavol Valovic, USC

See also 
 NCAA Men's Water Polo Championship
 NCAA Women's Water Polo Championship

References

NCAA Men's Water Polo Championship
NCAA Men's Water Polo Championship
2006 in sports in California
December 2006 sports events in the United States
2006